Vidošiči is a dispersed settlement in the Municipality of Metlika in the White Carniola area of southeastern Slovenia, next to the border with Croatia. The area is part of the traditional region of Lower Carniola and is now included in the Southeast Slovenia Statistical Region.

The local church, built on a hill northeast of the village, is dedicated to Saint Anne and belongs to the Parish of Metlika. It was built in the early 19th century.

References

External links
Vidošiči on Geopedia

Populated places in the Municipality of Metlika